George Jasper Groves (19 October 1868 – 18 February 1941) was an English footballer who played as a defender, primarily for Sheffield United. He also played first-class cricket for Nottinghamshire.

Football career
Born in Nottingham Groves was an amateur player who played regularly in the Sheffield area from around 1888 when he represented Heeley. He moved to Sheffield Club later the same year but almost immediately began guesting for nearby Sheffield United (as allowed by FA rules regarding amateurs).  After appearing regularly in friendly and exhibition fixtures he was signed on a permanent basis by United in March 1891 and remained with the club until the summer of 1896.

Known as 'Mr. Groves' in match reports he was initially a regular for United and was usually named captain but less than a year after joining he moved to London and from then on would only make irregular appearances for the club.  He would also appear as a guest for Woolwich Arsenal during the same period but with the game becoming increasingly professional he drifted away from league football.

Cricket career
Groves played in 17 first-class cricket matches for Nottinghamshire in 1899 and 1900, playing as a lower-middle-order right-handed batsman.

Personal life
Groves was a journalist, covering numerous sports in particular cricket and horse racing.  Groves retired to Newmarket after his playing career was over, where he continued to write for the Sporting Chronicle until his death.  Groves was killed when the Chronicle's offices were hit by a German bomb while he was working on 18 February 1941.

References

1868 births
1941 deaths
Footballers from Nottingham
English footballers
British civilians killed in World War II
Association football defenders
Heeley F.C. players
Sheffield F.C. players
Sheffield United F.C. players
Arsenal F.C. players
Midland Football League players
Northern Football League players
English Football League players
English cricketers
Nottinghamshire cricketers
Deaths by airstrike during World War II